Fabrizio Sforza (died 12 October 2009) was an Italian makeup artist. He was nominated for an Academy Award in the category Best Makeup and Hairstyling for the film The Adventures of Baron Munchausen.

Selected filmography
 The Adventures of Baron Munchausen (1988)

References

External links

2009 deaths
Best Makeup BAFTA Award winners
Italian make-up artists